Nannine was an electoral district of the Legislative Assembly in the Australian state of Western Australia from 1894 to 1897.

The district was located in the Western Australian outback. It existed for one term of parliament, and was represented in that time by Ministerialist Frederick Illingworth. Following the district's abolition, Illingworth switched to the seat of Central Murchison at the 1897 general election.

Members for Nannine

Election results

References

Nannine
1894 establishments in Australia
Nannine
1897 disestablishments in Australia
Nannine